Rheed McCracken (born 20 January 1997) is an Australian Paralympic athletics competitor. He named the 2012 Junior Athlete of the Year as part of the Australian Paralympian of the Year Awards. He represented Australia at the 2012 London Paralympics,  2016 Rio Paralympics and 2020 Tokyo Paralympics, where he won three silver and two bronze medals.

Personal
McCracken was born on 20 January 1997, and is from Bundaberg. McCracken has cerebral palsy, a condition he was born with.  He started using a wheelchair in late 2009 because it was less painful. He attended Avoca State School. He later attended Bundaberg State High School.

Athletics

McCracken is a wheelchair racer, competing in the T34 class.  He competes in 100 metres, 200 metres, 400 metres, 800 metres and 1,500 metres.

He began competing in athletics in 2005, and started wheelchair racing in 2010. He is a member of the Bundaberg Athletic Club.

In 2008, at the Queensland 12 years and under Track and Field Championships, McCracken came in first place in the boys 11 years AWD 100m, 200m, long jump, shot put and discus events. In 2008, he participated in the Pan Pacific Games in Canberra.  He took home first place in the Athletes With a Disability (AWD) 11 years boys' 100m, long jump, shot put and discus events. In 2009, he participated in the Queensland State Championships in the  boys 12 years Athletes With a Disability long jump, 100m, discus and shot put events, winning every one of them.

In 2010, McCracken competed in the Queensland Secondary Schools Championships, where he won the AWD boys 400m event.  That year, he also competed at the Queensland State Championships and the Australian National Championships.

In 2011, McCracken made his Australian national team debut During 2011, in preparation for the Paralympics, he completed six total training sessions a week. He finished third at the Gold Coast Airport Marathon's wheelchair half-marathon in July 2011. In 2011, he competed in Sydney's City2Surf event in the first year the event had an elite wheelchair category. In December, he competed at the 2011 International Wheelchair and Amputee Championships in Dubai, where he won the 100 metre wheelchair racing event with a time of 16.86 seconds. The time qualified him for the 2012 Paralympics as the qualifying time was 17 seconds.  Other events he competed in included the 200 metres, 400 metres, 800 metres and 1,500 metres, taking silver in the 400 metres, 800 metres and 1,500 metres events. He was half a second slow in the 200 metres event from setting a Paralympic qualifying time. Making his national team debut, he was one of the youngest members of the Australian team at the event. In December 2011, he participated in a national athletics team training camp in Canberra.

In January 2012, McCracken participated in the  Australia Day Series in Canberra, where he finished second with a time of 24.38 in the junior race. In January 2012, he trained in Sydney.  He later trained with Kurt Fearnley in Newcastle. In January 2012, he finished second the Oz Day 10K men's junior division. He was selected to represent Australia at the 2012 Summer Paralympics in athletics in the 100 metre and 200 metre events.  He qualified for the Games in December 2011 as a fourteen-year-old.

At the 2012 Summer Paralympics McCracken won a silver in the Men's 100 m T34 and a bronze in the Men's 200 m T34. Competing at the 2013 IPC Athletics World Championships in Lyon, France, he won three silver medals in the Men's 100 m, 200 m T34 and Men's 400 m and a bronze medal in Men's 800 m T34.

At the 2016 Rio Paralympics, he won the silver medal in the Men's 100 m T34 and a bronze medal in the Men's 800 m T34.

At the Swiss National Championships in Arbon on 28 May 2017, McCracken set a new world record in the Men's 100m T34 with a time of 14.92.

At the 2017 World Para Athletics Championships in London, England, McCracken won the silver medal in the Men's 100m T34 (15.40 (+0.3)) and a bronze medal in the Men's 200m T34 (27.81 (-1.5)).

At the 2019 World Para Athletics Championships in Dubai, he won his third world championship silver medal in the Men's 100 m T34.

At the 2020 Tokyo Summer Paralympics, he won the silver medal in the Men's 100m T34. McCracken finished seventh in his Men's 800m T34 heat and qualified for the final. He came sixth in the final and failed to win a medal in this event. 

He is coached by Andrew Dawes.

World records

Recognition
2012 Junior Athlete of the Year as part of the Australian Paralympian of the Year Awards.
2016 - Junior Male Athlete of the Year - Sporting Wheelies and Disabled Association.

Notes

External links
 
 
 Rheed McCracken at Australian Athletics Historical Results

Paralympic athletes of Australia
Living people
1997 births
Athletes (track and field) at the 2012 Summer Paralympics
Athletes (track and field) at the 2016 Summer Paralympics
Athletes (track and field) at the 2020 Summer Paralympics
Paralympic silver medalists for Australia
Paralympic bronze medalists for Australia
Wheelchair category Paralympic competitors
World record holders in Paralympic athletics
Medalists at the 2012 Summer Paralympics
Medalists at the 2016 Summer Paralympics
Medalists at the 2020 Summer Paralympics
Sportspeople from Bundaberg
Paralympic medalists in athletics (track and field)